2018 NBA season may refer to:

2017–18 NBA season
2018–19 NBA season